Martin A. Carr was an Irish born architect, educated in England who was well known for his designs of Chicago area churches. His designs include:

St. Charles on 12th street
St. Michael's on Washington
St. Basil/Visitation
Immaculate Conception

An avid reader of British art and Gothic Revivalist John Ruskin, some of his designs such as for Visitation have a very unusually sophisticated design.

References

Irish architects
Architects of Roman Catholic churches
Defunct architecture firms based in Chicago